Sillewada is a census town in Nagpur district in the Indian state of Maharashtra. It is a coal mine town with Western Coalfields Limited having several mines in and around the place.

Demographics
 India census, Sillewada had a population of 8503. Males constitute 53% of the population and females 47%. Sillewada has an average literacy rate of 75%, higher than the national average of 59.5%: male literacy is 80%, and female literacy is 69%. In Sillewada, 12% of the population is under 6 years of age.

References

Cities and towns in Nagpur district